Yang Dan is a Chinese-American neuroscientist. She is the Paul Licht Distinguished Professor of Neurobiology at the University of California, Berkeley and a Howard Hughes Medical Institute (HHMI) Investigator. She is a past recipient of the Alfred P. Sloan Research Fellowship, Beckman Young Investigator Award, and Society for Neuroscience Research Awards for Innovation in Neuroscience. Recognized for her research on the neural circuits that control behavior, she was elected to the US National Academy of Sciences in 2018.

Dan's current research is focused on understanding the neural circuits that control sleep in the mammalian brain, as well as how the "frontal cortex exerts top-down executive control."Dan uses the mouse as her model organism combined with optogenetics, imaging, virus-mediated circuit tracing, and electrophysiology.

Early life and education 
Dan was born and raised in Beijing, China. She considers her father, a physicist, as a key influence in her decision to become a scientist, together with stories she heard as a child about Albert Einstein and Marie Curie.

Dan graduated from Peking University with a bachelor's degree in physics. She moved to the United States to pursue graduate studies at Columbia University, where she earned her Ph.D. in biology in 1994. Her doctoral advisor was Mu-ming Poo, with whom she conducted research on "cellular mechanisms of neurotransmitter secretion and synaptic plasticity." She subsequently conducted postdoctoral research at the Rockefeller University and later Harvard Medical School, where she looked at information coding in the visual system.

Career 
In 1997, Dan began teaching in the Molecular and Cell Biology Department of the University of California, Berkeley, and later became the Paul Licht Distinguished Professor. She is also a Howard Hughes Medical Institute (HHMI) Investigator.

Her research projects include neural circuits controlling sleep and the function of the prefrontal cortex. In a 2015 research paper published in Nature, Dan and her team found that activation of GABAergic neurons in the medulla oblongata brain region of sleeping mice causes them to enter REM sleep or the dream state, whereas the same activation in mice when they are awake causes them to eat more.

Dan was elected to the US National Academy of Sciences (NAS) in 2018, in recognition of her "contributions to understanding the microcircuits underlying cortical computation, cellular mechanisms for functional plasticity, and neural circuits controlling sleep", and more generally, her research on the neural circuits that control behavior.

Personal life 
Dan's husband is Mu-ming Poo, her former academic advisor and also a member of the National Academy of Sciences.

References 

Year of birth missing (living people)
Living people
Peking University alumni
Columbia Graduate School of Arts and Sciences
University of California, Berkeley College of Letters and Science faculty
American women biologists
Chinese women biologists
American neuroscientists
Chinese neuroscientists
Chinese women neuroscientists
Biologists from Beijing
Howard Hughes Medical Investigators
Members of the United States National Academy of Sciences
Educators from Beijing
Chinese emigrants to the United States
21st-century American women scientists